Shine Wrestling is an all-female professional wrestling promotion which was founded in mid–2012. Over the course since, it has held more than 60 internet pay-per-views.

Shine 1

Shine 2

Shine 3

Shine 4

Shine 5

Shine 6

Shine 7

Shine 8

Shine 9

Shine 10

Shine 11

Shine 12

Shine 13

Shine 14

Shine 15

Shine 16

Shine 17

Shine 18

Shine 19

Shine 20

Shine 21

Shine 22

Shine 23

Shine 24

Shine 25

Shine 26

Shine 27

Shine 28

Shine 29

Shine 30

Shine 31

Shine 32

Shine 33

Shine 34

Shine 35

Shine 36

Shine 37

Shine 38

Shine 39

Shine 40

Shine 41

Shine 42

Shine 43

Shine 44

Shine 45

Shine 46

Shine 47 "Survival"

Shine 48

Shine 49

Shine 50

Shine 51

Shine 52

Shine 53

Shine 54

Shine 55

Shine 56

Shine 57

Shine 58

Shine 59

Shine 60 - 7th Anniversary Show

Shine 61

Shine 62

Shine 63

Shine 64

Shine 65

Shine 66

Shine 67

Shine 68

Shine 69

Shine 70

Shine 71

Shine 72

See also
Shimmer Volumes
List of NCW Femme Fatales events

References

External links 

Shimmer Women Athletes
Women's professional wrestling shows
Professional wrestling in Florida